Ursula Schröder-Feinen (21 July 1936 – 9 February 2005) was a German operatic soprano who performed at the Metropolitan Opera and the Bayreuth Festival.

Career
She was born in Gelsenkirchen, where she studied voice with Maria Helm. Later she studied at the Folkwangschule in Essen. From 1958 she sang in the opera chorus of her hometown. In 1961 her career as a soloist began with singing the title role of Aida. She was a member of the ensemble of the Deutsche Oper am Rhein from 1968 to 1972.

She performed at the Edinburgh Festival, the Vienna State Opera and at La Scala. She appeared as a guest at the Deutsche Oper Berlin, in Leipzig, Geneve, Straßburg, Kopenhagen, Prag and Amsterdam, among others.

Her debut at the Metropolitan Opera was in 1970 as Chrysothemis in Elektra, with Birgit Nilsson and Regina Resnik, conducted by Karl Böhm. She sang Brünnhilde in Siegfried in 1972, Salome in 1973, the title role of Elektra in 1976 and in 1978 the Färberin in Die Frau ohne Schatten.

At the Bayreuth Festival, she appeared as Senta in Der fliegende Holländer from 1971 to 1975, Brünnhilde in Siegfried in 1973, Ortrud in Lohengrin in 1972, and Kundry in Parsifal in 1975.

At the Salzburg Festival, she sang the Färberin in Die Frau ohne Schatten in 1975, with Leonie Rysanek, James King, Ruth Hesse and Walter Berry, Karl Böhm conducting the Vienna Philharmonic.

In 1970, she sang the part of Kundry at the opera of Rome in 1970. Her performance was described:
As Kundry, Schröder-Feinen is remarkable in her ability not only to perform the role well, but to imbue it with a vocal characterization that emerges on a recording and not just on stage. Her voice is suited to the role, not only for the demands that the role poses, but in the intensity with which she approaches the entirety of the second act. This performance benefits from a freshness and spontaneity often hoped for a Kundry to embody. ... Vocally, Schröder-Feinen triumphs in her execution of the act with elan.

In 1973, she performed the title role of Salome in the Canadian premiere of the opera. She sang the part also at the Edinburgh Festival. In 1974, she sang the Färberin at the Salzburg Festival. In 1977, she appeared in the title role of Elektra at the Vienna State Opera, conducted by Horst Stein, with Gwyneth Jones as Chrysothemis, Christa Ludwig as Klytämnestra, Theo Adam as Orest and Hans Beirer as Aegisth. She appeared as Isolde, and performed the title roles Tosca, Turandot, Alceste and Jenůfa.

She retired in the late 1970s. Schröder-Feinen died in 2005 in Hennef, near Bonn.

Recordings
Her voice is heard in live recordings, excerpts from Marschner's Hans Heiling, conducted by George Alexander Albrecht, from Lohengrin (with Anna Tomowa-Sintow, René Kollo, Siegmund Nimsgern, Robert Kerns and Karl Ridderbusch, Herbert von Karajan conducting the Berlin Philharmonic, the aria of Rezia from Weber's Oberon, conducted by Rafael Kubelík, and from Die Frau ohne Schatten in Salzburg 1975.

A collection of recordings from the Deutsche Oper am Rhein includes Leonore's aria "Abscheulicher! Wo eilst du hin?" from Fidelio, the "Erzählung" of Sieglinde from Die Walküre, and excerpts from a 1973 performance of Elektra with Schröder-Feinen in the title role and Astrid Varnay as Klytämnestra.

References

External links 
 
 
 , "In questa reggia" from Puccini's Turandot
 1976 Elektra Broadcast from the Met
 Ursula Schröder-Feinen isoldes-liebestod.info 

1936 births
2005 deaths
German operatic sopranos
20th-century German women opera singers
People from Gelsenkirchen
Folkwang University of the Arts alumni